Juha-Pekka Hytönen (born May 22, 1981) is a Finnish ice hockey forward currently playing for JYP Jyväskylä.

Career
Juha-Pekka Hytönen started his career in JYP Jyväskylä junior teams. In 1999 he was chosen to Finnish national U18 team and next year to the Finnish national U20 team. In 2000 Hytönen played his first game in SM-liiga, the Finnish elite league. Before his move to KHL he played always with JYP Jyväskylä apart from one season in Jukurit and few games in Diskos both teams in Mestis.

In 2006 he became captain of JYP and played in championship-winning team in 2009. He was also chosen to Finland's squad for the World Championships that year, as well as in 2010, 2013 and 2015.

After winning another Finnish championship with JYP in 2012, Hytönen embarked on a new challenge, joining KHL side Amur Khabarovsk, where he spent the 2012-13 campaign.

In 2013 he signed a 2-year contract with Lausanne Hockey Club (LHC) in the Swiss National League A (NLA). As the team's top scorer, he helped Lausanne qualify for the playoffs for the first time in the club's history by tallying 39 points (16 goals/23 assists) in 49 games.

In 2014, he was named LHC's alternate captain along with Etienne Froidevaux. Hytönen left Lausanne after three years, opting to return to his hometown team JYP in April 2016.

Awards

Champions Hockey League Champion in 2017–18
Finnish Champion (Kanada-malja) in 2008–09, 2011–12.
Mestis Champion in 2002–03

References

External links

1981 births
Amur Khabarovsk players
Finnish ice hockey centres
JYP Jyväskylä players
Mikkelin Jukurit players
Living people
Lausanne HC players
Sportspeople from Jyväskylä